This is a list of recipients and nominees of the Governor General's Awards award for English-language poetry. The award was created in 1981 when the Governor General's Award for English language poetry or drama was divided.

Winners and nominees

1980s

1990s

2000s

2010s

2020s

References

English
Canadian poetry awards
Awards established in 1981
1981 establishments in Canada
Poetry
English-language literary awards